Saré de Tuili is a village in the Kombissiri Department of Bazèga Province in Centre-Sud Region of central Burkina Faso. The village has a population of 298.

References

Populated places in the Centre-Sud Region
Bazèga Province